Ningyuan may refer to the following locations in China:

County 
 Ningyuan County, in Yongzhou, Hunan

Subdistrict (街道)/Town (镇) 
 , in Xingcheng, Huludao, Liaoning
 , in Tiexi District, Anshan, Liaoning
 , in Anding District, Dingxi, Gansu
 , in Bin County, Harbin, Heilongjiang
 , in Jinchuan District, Jinchang, Gansu

Historic 
 Ningyuan, Sichuan
 Xingcheng, Huludao, Liaoning, formerly Ningyuan (宁远)
 Battle of Ningyuan (宁远之战), 1626
 Yining City and Yining County, Xinjiang, formerly Ningyuan (寧遠)

Other places 
 , in Ningyuanbao Village, Qiaodong District, Zhangjiakou, Hebei
 Roman Catholic Diocese of Ningyuan
 Zhangjiakou Ningyuan Airport